Kissufim (lit. Yearning) is a kibbutz in the northwestern Negev desert in Israel. Located adjacent to the Gaza Strip at an altitude of 92 meters above sea level, it falls under the jurisdiction of Eshkol Regional Council.

History
The village was established in 1951 by Zionist youth movement members from the United States and South America. One of the members who established the Kibbutz was Ami Saull, who was born in Manhattan 1932, and was nephew of Israel Galili and father of the film maker Dror Shaul. Kissufim is part of the Shalom bloc of Israeli settlement meant to secure Israel's southern border with the Gaza Strip from the  numerous Palestinian Fedayeen infiltrations. The national government has recently financed building additions to each home which also serve as bomb shelters, with reinforced concrete.

Tell Jemmeh is a major archaeological site located about 5 kilometers east-northeast of Kissufim, on the southern bank of HaBesor Stream.

Economy
The kibbutz economy largely relies on its milk production, chicken farming, a citrus grove which is being phased out, an avocado orchard, and renting out land to the Israel Defense Forces.  Avocados are the primary income and Kissufim is one of the only producers of Avocados in Israel during the summer months.  Income from land rented from the IDF helps cover the pension costs and other agricultural land is managed by neighboring villages, with profits split.

At one point it had a factory that produced plastic frames for glasses and raised chinchillas for their fur.  Both endeavours were economic failures. The village also houses an archaeological museum (named after Ami Saull, father of Dror Shaul)  displaying artifacts found in the surrounding area.  Kissufim is currently undergoing a process of privatization in which homes will soon be owned by individuals rather than the collective.

Kissufim crossing
The nearby crossing into the Gaza Strip, named for the kibbutz, was the main route for traffic into the Gush Katif Israeli settlement bloc. It was permanently closed to inbound Israeli civilian traffic on 15 August 2005 as part of the disengagement plan. The last Israeli soldier left the Gaza strip and closed the gate at dawn of 12 September 2005, completing the Israeli withdrawal from the Gaza Strip.

Notable people
 Avihu Medina, composer, arranger, songwriter and singer
 Dror Shaul,  filmmaker

References

External links
Official website 
Kissufim Negev Information Centre
15-minute movie on Kissufim in the 1950s Steven Spielberg Jewish Film Archive
Kissufim Bo HaBayta article

Archaeology links

 Regarding Early Paleolithic flint tools of Acheulean technology in the Kissufim museum.

American-Jewish culture in Israel
Kibbutzim
Kibbutz Movement
Populated places established in 1951
Gaza envelope
Populated places in Southern District (Israel)
South American-Jewish culture in Israel
1951 establishments in Israel